Ischnomera is a genus of false blister beetles in the subfamily Oedemerinae.

Species 
Ischnomera contains over 40 species:

References 

Oedemeridae
Beetle genera